is a Japanese football player who plays as Midfielder. He currently play for Reilac Shiga FC.

Club career
Saito joined to J1 League club; Urawa Red Diamonds in 2015. In 2016, he moved to J2 League club; Mito HollyHock.

On 7 January 2023, Saito announcement officially transfer to JFL club, Reilac Shiga FC for ahead of 2023 season.

National team career
In October 2013, Saito was elected Japan U-17 national team for 2013 U-17 World Cup. He played 3 matches.

Career statistics

Club
Updated to the start of 2023 season.

References

External links

Profile at Mito HollyHock
Profile at Reilac Shiga FC

1996 births
Living people
Association football people from Saitama Prefecture
Japanese footballers
J1 League players
J2 League players
J3 League players
Japan Football League players
Urawa Red Diamonds players
Mito HollyHock players
J.League U-22 Selection players
Japan Soccer College players
Suzuka Point Getters players
Association football midfielders